The Isuzu Gala Mio (kana:いすゞ・ガーラミオ) is a midicoach produced by Isuzu through the J-Bus joint venture. It is also available as the intercity coach only.

First generation (1999-2004)
 KK-LR233E1/J1 (1999)

Second generation (2004-present)
The second generation Gala Mio is a rebadged Hino Melpha.
 PB-RR7JJAJ (2004)
 BDG-RR7JJBJ (2007)
 SDG-RR7JJCJ (2011)

Model lineup
 M-I
 M-II
 M-III

See also 

 List of buses

External links

 Isuzu Gala Mio Homepage

Galamio
Buses of Japan
Intercity buses
Midibuses
Single-deck buses
Vehicles introduced in 1999